The Hummel Ultracruiser (also variously called the Ultra Cruiser and UltraCruiser) is an American amateur-built aircraft, designed by Morry Hummel and produced by Hummel Aviation. The aircraft is supplied as a kit or plans for amateur construction or as a complete ready-to-fly aircraft.

Design and development

The aircraft is made from sheet aluminum. Construction time from the supplied kit is estimated as 420 hours.

Operational history
By December 2011 100 examples had been completed and flown.

Variants
Ultracruiser
Base model for the US FAR 103 Ultralight Vehicles category, powered by a  1/2 VW.
Ultracruiser Plus
Model for larger and heavier pilots, powered by a  Volkswagen air-cooled engine, for the US experimental amateur-built category.

Specifications (Ultracruiser)

References

External links

Homebuilt aircraft
Ultralight aircraft
Single-engined tractor aircraft
Hummel Aviation aircraft